Suzanna Danuta Walters is the director of the Women's, Gender, and Sexuality Studies Program and professor of sociology at Northeastern University, Boston. She is also the editor-in-chief of Signs: Journal of Women in Culture and Society and the author of several books, including The Tolerance Trap: How God, Genes, and Good Intentions are Sabotaging Gay Equality. She is the author of the op-ed "Why can't we hate men?" in The Washington Post.

Education 
Walters gained her Ph.D from the City University of New York in 1990.

Bibliography

Books

Book chapters

Journal articles 
 
 
 
 
  Text.

Other media

References

External links 
 
 Profile page: Suzanna Danuta Walters Northeastern University

American sociologists
American women sociologists
City University of New York alumni
Graduate Center, CUNY alumni
Living people
Northeastern University faculty
Place of birth missing (living people)
Year of birth missing (living people)
21st-century American women